Hokchiu may refer to:

 Fuzhou, the capital of Fujian province.
 Foochow people
 Fuzhou dialect